Mnesteria is a genus of moth in the family Lecithoceridae.

Species
 Mnesteria basanistis (Meyrick, 1908)
 Mnesteria pharetrata (Meyrick, 1905)
 Mnesteria sideraula Meyrick, 1916

References

Natural History Museum Lepidoptera genus database

 
Lecithocerinae
Moth genera